Kheyrabad (also Romanized as Kheyrābād; also known as Ḩeydarābād) is a village in Bampur-e Sharqi Rural District, in the Central District of Bampur County, Sistan and Baluchestan Province, Iran. At the 2006 census, its population was 1,845, in 400 families.

References 

Populated places in Bampur County